Francis Edward Coughlin (February 28, 1896 – September 8, 1951) was an American football player and coach.

Biography

War and college football
During World War I, Coughlin served in the United States Navy aboard a minesweeper. After the war, he played at the collegiate level at the University of Notre Dame. He was named captain of the 1920 football squad after the team's current captain, George Gipp withdrew from the University.

NFL career
For the 1921 season, Coughlin was named as a player-coach for the Rock Island Independents of the American Professional Football Association, which was renamed the National Football League in 1922.

On October 16, 1921, down 7-0 to the Chicago Cardinals, Coughlin scored two touchdowns to help give the Independents a 14-7 lead in the second quarter.  Team owner Walter Flanigan ordered tackle Ed Healey to relieve Coughlin. Once Coughlin was safely on his way toward the sideline, Healey delivered a message to Jimmy Conzelman from Flanigan, it read: "Coughlin was fired! The new coach was Conzelman!" This act marked the first and only time an owner hired a new coach in the middle of a game. Coughlin then spent the rest of the 1921 season playing for the Detroit Tigers and the Green Bay Packers.

After football
In 1923, Coughlin became a prosecutor in St. Joseph County, Indiana. From 1945–1949, he served as the assistant Attorney General of Indiana, under Governors Ralph Gates and Henry Schricker.

References

1896 births
1951 deaths
American football tackles
Detroit Tigers (NFL) players
Green Bay Packers players
Rock Island Independents coaches
Rock Island Independents players
Notre Dame Fighting Irish football players
Sportspeople from Chicago
Players of American football from Chicago